Martina Franca is a railway station in Martina Franca, Italy. The station is located on the Bari–Martina Franca–Taranto railway and Martina Franca-Lecce railway. The train services and the railway infrastructure are operated by Ferrovie del Sud Est.

Train services
The station is served by the following service(s):

Local services (Treno regionale) Bari - Conversano - Putignano - Martina Franca
Local services (Treno regionale) Martina Franca - Taranto
Local services (Treno regionale) Martina Franca - Francavilla Fontana - Novoli - Lecce

References

This article is based upon a translation of the Italian language version as at May 2014.

External links

Railway stations in Apulia
Martina station
Buildings and structures in the Province of Taranto